Michael De Lisio is an electrical engineer with Wavestream Corporation in San Dimas, California. He was named a Fellow of the Institute of Electrical and Electronics Engineers (IEEE) in 2014 for his leadership in, and commercialization of, high power microwave and millimeter-wave technologies.

References 

Fellow Members of the IEEE
Living people
Year of birth missing (living people)
Place of birth missing (living people)
American electrical engineers